Kjartan () is a masculine given name found in the Nordic countries, most prominently in Iceland and Norway.

Kjartan may refer to:

 Kjartan Finnbogason (born 1986), Icelandic international football player
 Kjartan Fløgstad (born 1944), Norwegian author
 Kjartan Gunnarsson (born 1951), Icelandic politician and lawyer
 Kjartan Haugen (born 1975), Norwegian cross-country skier and Paralympic gold medallist
 Kjartan Kristiansen (born 1963), Norwegian guitarist and backing vocalist in band DumDum Boys
 Kjartan Ólafsson (disambiguation), various people
 Kjartan Poskitt (born 1956), English author and television presenter
 Kjartan Salvesen (born 1976), Norwegian pop singer
 Kjartan Sturluson (born 1975), Icelandic international football goalkeeper
 Kjartan Sveinsson (born 1978), Icelandic keyboardist of the band Sigur Rós
Kjartan the Cruel, a fictional character in The Last Kingdom television series and The Saxon Stories books

References

Faroese masculine given names
Icelandic masculine given names
Norwegian masculine given names
Scandinavian masculine given names